Shanimol Osman is an Indian politician from Kerala. Shanimol was elected as M.L.A to Kerala legislative assembly from Aroor on a by-election in 2019.

She is the first woman leader from Kerala to become the secretary of All India Congress Committee  and is an LLB Degree holder.
She contested  from Alappuzha parliament constituency in 2019 election as Indian National Congress candidate and lost to Adv. A. M. Ariff of Communist Party of India by 9213 votes but in the assembly by-election 2019, she defeated the nearest rival candidate Manu C. Pulickal of the CPI (M) Party by a margin of 2,079 votes.

Shanimol Osman is the only woman MLA of UDF in the 2016 Kerala Legislative Assembly.

References

Indian National Congress politicians from Kerala
Living people
1966 births
Kerala MLAs 2016–2021
21st-century Indian women politicians
Women members of the Kerala Legislative Assembly